Cəyirli (also, Çayırlı, Dzhairli, Dzheirli, and Dzheyirli) is a village and municipality in the Goychay Rayon of Azerbaijan.  It has a population of 1,844. The municipality consists of the villages of Cəyirli and Qubadlı Şıxlı.

References 

Populated places in Goychay District